Premna maxima is a species of plant in the family Lamiaceae. It is endemic to Kenya.

References

Flora of Kenya
maxima
Vulnerable plants
Endemic flora of Kenya
Taxonomy articles created by Polbot